An ishti in Hinduism is a series of oblations to different deities.

References

Hindu practices